KCIE (90.5 FM) is a radio station broadcasting a Variety format. Licensed to Dulce, New Mexico, United States, the station is currently owned by the Jicarilla Apache Tribe.

History
The station was assigned the call sign KJAT on September 14, 1987. On September 21, 1990, the station changed its call sign to KCIE.  The station itself would not sign on until December 3, 1991.

References

External links

CIE
Native American radio
NPR member stations
Jicarilla Apache